Nickelodeon is a Malaysian television channel owned by Astro. It launched on May 21, 1999.

Nickelodeon is available on Astro Channel 616. English is a primary audio of the channel with dubbing in Malay on the secondary audio channel. In 2008, a third audio channel Mandarin was added. However, the Malay and Mandarin audio channels are only available on selected programming blocks. It attempted to access them on blocks where they are not transmitted yields the English primary audio channel.

History

Many of Nickelodeon's programming is also available on free-to-air channel 8TV and TV9, though dubbed into Malay with the original English language track lost, as part of its Nickelodeon block, called Nick di 9 in 2006–2016 at 02:30 pm to 05:30 pm. However, CJ WOW Shop took over time on that slot, it moved to 08:30 am to 10:00 am every Monday to Thursday prior 4 April 2016 to 1 March 2018 and later reduced to every day at 07.00 pm for showing selected program on 5 March 2018. More popular programs are also aired with their original English And Malay soundtracks on TV3, NTV7 and 8TV.

On 26 August 2019, Unifi TV broadcast the channel in HD due to high viewership.

On 22 November 2019, Astro broadcast the channel in HD on Channel 632 and moved to Channel 616 on 1 April 2020.

In late March 2019, Nick's show slot on TV9 was transferred to TV3 under a new name, Nickelodeon Bananana! TV3. It runs from 10am to 11am.

Closure
As part of a restructuring at Paramount Networks EMEAA and as preparation of the launch of Paramount+ in Southeast Asia in 2023, Nickelodeon Malaysia began to cease broadcasting.

Current programs

See also
Nickelodeon South East Asia
ViacomCBS Networks International
Nickeledeon Bananana TV3 (Redirects to Malay Wikipedia)

External links
 Nickelodeon SEA Homepage

Malaysia
Television channels and stations established in 1999
1999 establishments in Malaysia
Nickelodeon